Jinling Shengmu  is a Taoist deity and character in the 16th-century Chinese novel, Fengshen Yanyi, which is also known as The Investiture of the Gods.

Legend
In Fengshen Yanyi, Jinling Shengmu is an immortal from Golden Turtle Island and one of the four chief disciples of Tongtian Jiaozhu. Her original form was a giant tortoise which she has cultivated for thousands of years to become immortal.

Once Guang Chengzi accidentally attacked her with a sword. As a result of the attack, she returned to her original form that caused a rift and lead to an open war between Branch Jie and Branch Chan. This war would last for many decades, leading to a final confrontation during the fall of the Shang Dynasty.

During the Battle of the Ten Thousand Immortals, she kills Princess Longji and Hong Jin and confronts the three great immortals, Wenshu Guangfa Tianzun, Puxian Zhenren, and Cihang Zhenren. She is not defeated in the battle against the great immortals but later dies by the powerful weapon, Dinghai Shenzhu wielded by Randeng Daoren. 

After her death, Jiang Ziya is deified as the deity of Kangong Doumu, the head of Ziwei Zhizun (紫薇之尊), who has 84,000 stars and spirits to drive. Her position is important and high in heaven. She is in charge of Jin Que, sits in Dou Mansion, and ranks first among Zhou Tian's places. In the esoteric teachings of Taoism, she is identified as the same as Doumu.

References

Chinese goddesses
Deities in Taoism
Investiture of the Gods characters